Arignote or Arignota (Arignṓtē;  fl. c. ) was a Pythagorean philosopher from Croton or Samos. She was known as a student of Pythagoras and Theano and, according to some traditions, their daughter as well.

Life
According to the Suda, Arignote wrote:
Bacchica (Βακχικά, Bakkhika, "Of Bacchus") 
The Mysteries of Demetra (Περὶ τῶν Δήμητρος Μυστηρίων, Peri ton Demetros Mysterion) 
A Sacred Discourse (Ἱερὸς Λόγος, Hieros Logos)
Mysteries of Dionysus (Τελεταὶ Διονύσου, Teletai Dionysou)

Writings attributed to her were extant in Porphyry's day.

Among the Pythagorean Sacred Discourses (Ἱεροὶ Λόγοι, ΄΄Hieroi Logoi΄΄) there is a dictum attributed to Arignote:
The eternal essence of number is the most providential cause of the whole heaven, earth and the region in between. Likewise it is the root of the continued existence of the gods and daimones, as well as that of divine men.

References

5th-century BC Greek people
5th-century BC philosophers
5th-century BC women writers
5th-century BC writers
6th-century BC Greek people
6th-century BC philosophers
6th-century BC women writers
6th-century BC writers
Ancient Crotonians
Ancient Greek metaphysicians
Ancient Greek women philosophers
Pythagoreans
Pythagoreans of Magna Graecia
Ancient Greek women writers
6th-century BC Greek women
5th-century BC Greek women